Ruth Aspöck (born February 7, 1947 in Salzburg) is an Austrian writer who lives in Vienna.

Biography
She studied drama and Germanic language and literature in Vienna and Linz, and completed her studies with journeys to Cuba among other countries. She founded a feminist magazine in Vienna called Auf.

Works 

 Der ganze Zauber nennt sich Wissenschaft (1982)
 Emma oder Die Mühen der Architektur. Die Geschichte einer Frau aus Wien (1987)
 Ausnahmezustand für Anna (1992)
 Wo die Armut wohnt.  (1992)
 Tremendo swing. Die achtziger Jahre in Kuba (1997)
 Gedichtet. Prosaische Lyrik (1995)
 Muttersöhnchenmärchen (1996)
 (S)Trickspiel (2003)
 Kannitverstan (2005)

External links
 Kurzbiografie 
  

1947 births
Living people
Writers from Salzburg
Austrian magazine founders
German-language writers
Feminist writers
20th-century Austrian women writers
21st-century Austrian women writers